Luis Beltrán (Río Negro) is a village and municipality in Río Negro Province in Argentina.

Climate

June to August are the coldest months with mean temperatures below  while the warmest months are December to February when mean temperatures exceed . There are 215 frost-free days with the first date of frost normally occurring on 29 April and the last date of frost occurring on 25 September.

Precipitation is highly variable from year to year but is generally concentrated in the summer and autumn.

References

Populated places in Río Negro Province